Qianhong Gotsch, born He Qianhong, is a former female table tennis player from Germany. She won two medals in singles, and team events at the Table Tennis European Championships in 2000. She also won several tournaments of the ITTF Pro Tour.

References

Year of birth missing (living people)
Living people
German female table tennis players
Table tennis players from Tianjin
Naturalised table tennis players
Table tennis players at the 2000 Summer Olympics
Olympic table tennis players of Germany